Scott Vermillion (December 23, 1976 – December 25, 2020) was an American professional soccer player from Olathe, Kansas, who played for the Kansas City Wizards and Colorado Rapids. He entered the league in 1998 as a member of Generation Adidas, then known as Project 40. He was a Third Team All American in his junior year at the University of Virginia before joining Project 40. In his final season at UVA the team finished as runner up to UCLA in the 1997 NCAA Division I Men's Soccer Tournament.

He died on December 25, 2020, at the age of 44 from acute alcohol and prescription drug poisoning. In 2022, Boston University examined his brain and found that he suffered from chronic traumatic encephalopathy (CTE). Vermillion was the first soccer player to have been diagnosed with CTE posthumously.

References

1976 births
2020 deaths
Sportspeople from Olathe, Kansas
Sporting Kansas City players
Colorado Rapids players
Association football defenders
Soccer players from Kansas
American soccer players
Sportspeople with chronic traumatic encephalopathy